National Security Space Launch (NSSL) — formerly Evolved Expendable Launch Vehicle (EELV) from 1994 to 2019 — is a program of the United States Space Force (USSF) intended to assure access to space for United States Department of Defense and other United States government payloads. The program is managed by the Space Force's Space Systems Command (SSC), specifically the Assured Access to Space Directorate (SSC/AA), in partnership with the National Reconnaissance Office.

Started in 1994 as the Evolved Expendable Launch Vehicle launch system program, the initial program goal was to make government space launches more affordable and reliable, leading to the development of the Boeing Delta IV and Lockheed Martin Atlas V EELV families. As of 2019, these launch vehicles were the primary methods for launching U.S. military satellites, along with the Falcon 9 developed by SpaceX.

On 1 March 2019, the program name was changed from EELV to National Security Space Launch (NSSL) to better reflect the growing commercial launch market and the changing nature of launch contracts, including the potential for reusable launch vehicles.

The NSSL program launches the nation's most valuable military satellites; contracts to launch lower value payloads, such as those of the Space Test Program, are awarded using different methodologies.

History

Initial program goals 
The USAF began the EELV program in 1994, following many years of government-funded studies into improved systems and architecture. The intent was to replace legacy vehicles, including Delta II, Atlas II, and Titan IV. EELVs were to reduce costs by being based on standardized fairings, liquid core vehicles, upper stages, and solid rocket boosters. A Standard Payload Interface bus was also proposed as a way to save money and improve efficiency.

Reducing the cost of launches and ensuring national access to space were the two main goals of the USAF space launch/EELV program. Some of the reasons why assured access to space is a priority for the United States are stated in National Presidential Directive Number 40, which reads:
Access to space through U.S. space transportation capabilities is essential to:
 place critical United States Government assets and capabilities into space;
 augment space-based capabilities in a timely manner in the event of increased operational needs or minimize disruptions due to on-orbit satellite failures, launch failures, or deliberate actions against U.S. space assets;
 support government and commercial human space flight.
The United States, therefore, must maintain robust, responsive, and resilient U.S. space transportation capabilities to assure access to space.

Procurement of EELV boosters for military space launch was to evolve to more closely match commercial practice. The initial bids came from four major defense contractors: Lockheed Martin, Boeing, McDonnell Douglas, and Alliant Techsystems. Each of the bids included a variety of concepts. Boeing initially proposed using the RS-25 Space Shuttle main engine.

1990s-2000s 
In October 1998 two initial launch services contracts (known as Buy 1) were awarded. Along with the award of two development agreements, the total amount was more than $3 billion. Boeing was awarded a contract for 19 out of the 28 launches; Lockheed Martin was awarded a contract for the other 9. Boeing received $1.38 billion, and Lockheed Martin received $650 million for the launches. Boeing and Lockheed Martin were each awarded US$500 million for the final phase of the bid. Boeing developed the Delta IV based around Common Booster Cores and the Delta Cryogenic Second Stage, while Lockheed Martin developed the Atlas V based around Common Core Boosters and the Centaur upper stage.

In 2003, Boeing was found to be in possession of proprietary documents from Lockheed Martin. The USAF moved 7 launches from Delta IV to Atlas V. To end litigation and competition for a limited market, both companies agreed to form the United Launch Alliance (ULA) joint venture. Each company has a 50% stake in ULA.

2010s 
Prior to 2012, the USAF was advancing another program, the Reusable Booster System and other follow-on technologies, and up to early 2012 issued contract awards for various aspects of it, before the program was cancelled in October 2012.

In December 2012, the DoD announced a re-opening of the EELV-class launch vehicle market to competition while authorizing the USAF to proceed with a block buy of "up to" 36 boosters from ULA. At the same time, another 14 boosters were to be procured competitively beginning in 2015, with the initial launches to be performed in 2017.

The USAF signed a contract at that time with SpaceX for two launches in 2014 and 2015 to serve as proving flights to support the certification process for the Falcon 9 v1.1 and Falcon Heavy. In April 2014, after the launches were contracted, SpaceX sued the United States Air Force, arguing that the RD-180 engines, produced in Russia by the government owned NPO Energomash and used by the Atlas V, violated sanctions against the Russian government. The USAF and SpaceX settled the lawsuit in Jan 2015 by opening up more launches to competitive bidding. The USAF certified the Falcon 9 in May 2015, and in 2016 SpaceX won a contract under the EELV program to launch a GPS Block III satellite payload to MEO.

2018 to 2020s 
The USAF began the process of competitively selecting the next generation NSSL vehicles in 2018. Announced performance requirements include:

Category A payloads fit within a 4 m diameter payload envelope, category B payloads fit within a 5 m diameter payload envelope, and category C payloads require an extended 5 m diameter envelope.

The USAF and United States Space Force (USSF) plan to use the next generation NSSL launch vehicles until at least 2030.

Launch vehicles 
Since 2019 there are four vehicles certified by the Department of Defense to conduct NSSL launches: Atlas V, Delta IV Heavy, Falcon 9 and Falcon Heavy. Delta IV Medium was retired in August 2019. After a two-year solicitation and competition process in 2018–2020, in August 2020 the USSF selected SpaceX (F9 and FH) and ULA's yet-to-be-certified Vulcan Centaur to supply US military launch requirements in 2022–2027.

Retired

Delta IV medium 
Delta IV Medium flew with two or four SRBs on a single Common Booster Core. The DCSS had 4 m diameter and 5 m diameter versions, with matching diameter payload fairings. Delta IV CBCs and DCSSs are integrated horizontally before being transported to the launchpad. The 4 m diameter DCSS was retired with the Delta IV Medium after the 22 August 2019 launch of a GPS-III satellite on a Delta IV M+(4,2) two SRBs, and a 4 m diameter DCSS and payload fairing.

Certified and active

Atlas V 

Each Atlas V launch vehicle is based on a Common Core Booster powered by one NPO Energomash RD-180 engine with two combustion chambers and a Centaur upper stage powered by one or two Pratt & Whitney Rocketdyne RL10A-4-2 engines. Up to five Aerojet Rocketdyne Graphite-Epoxy Motor solid rocket boosters can be added to increase vehicle performance, and two diameters of payload fairing are available.

A three-digit (XYZ) naming convention is used for the Atlas V configuration identification. An Atlas V XYZ will have a  diameter payload fairing, Y solid rocket boosters (0-5), and Z RL-10's on the Centaur upper stage (1-2). As an example, an Atlas V 551 has a 5.4 m payload fairing, 5 SRBs, and 1 RL-10.

In August 2021, ULA announced that Atlas V would be retired, and all 29 remaining launches had been sold. , 19 launches remain.

Delta IV Heavy 

The Delta IV Heavy launch vehicle uses three Common Booster Cores (CBCs) each powered by a Pratt and Whitney Rocketdyne RS-68A engine, a Delta Cryogenic Second Stage 5 m (DCSS) powered by an RL10, and a 5 m payload fairing. Delta IV CBCs and DCSSs are integrated horizontally before being transported to the launchpad. In 2020, ULA announced that retirement of the Delta IV is anticipated in 2023 after 5 more launches.

Falcon 9 

The main features of the Falcon 9 in its current Block 5 version include two stages, both powered by LOX and RP-1, with nine Merlin 1D engines on the first stage and one Merlin 1D Vacuum engine on the second stage. This launcher features a reusable first stage and fairings, which lowers the cost per mission.

GPS-IIIA USA-289 was the first NSSL-type B5 Falcon 9 launch. The launch occurred on December 23, 2018.

Falcon Heavy 

The Falcon Heavy is a heavy-lift rocket developed and produced by SpaceX. It has been certified for the NSSL program after the STP-2 launch completed on 25 June 2019, as confirmed by the commander of the Air Force Space and Missile Systems Center, Lt. Gen. Thompson. He clarified: "I certified them to compete last year" and "[o]ne of the requirements behind certification is to fly three missions." This requirement has been satisfied by the Falcon Heavy test flight in February 2018, Arabsat-6A in April 2019, and the STP-2 launch in June 2019. Falcon Heavy has been certified for two Phase 1A reference orbits and as of 2019, "[i]t's not certified for all of our most stressing national security space orbits," Thompson said. The USAF is working with SpaceX to mature their Falcon Heavy's design.

As of September 2019, it has two manifested classified national security flights for the USAF in 2021.

Next generation vehicle competition 
In 2018, a competitive contract award to launch national security spacecraft was conducted between United Launch Alliance (ULA), Northrop Grumman Innovation Systems (NGIS), Blue Origin, and SpaceX.

Phase 1: development of detailed designs 

Two providers were to be selected to launch spacecraft to a number of reference orbits. In October 2018, the USAF awarded development funding to ULA, NGIS, and Blue Origin to further the design of their rockets before a subsequent competition for award to build the launch vehicles. SpaceX received none of this funding to develop their designs, as both the Falcon 9 and Falcon Heavy had completed development and were already flying.

New Glenn 
Blue Origin was awarded $500 million of phase 1 funding for further development of New Glenn as a potential competitor in future contracts. As of 2019, Blue Origin expected a first launch of New Glenn in 2021. In the event, no phase 2 funding from the US government was forthcoming after August 2020 when ULA Vulcan and SpaceX were selected by the Air Force. Blue Origin is considered likely to continue building and testing New Glenn, in part since they were already privately funding development prior to the Air Force NSSL competition.

OmegA
Northrop Grumman was awarded  of phase 1 funding in 2018 for development of OmegA. OmegA was a rocket design with two main solid stages, a cryogenic upper stage, and the possibility of additional solid-rocket strap-on boosters. As of 2019, the first flight has been stated by NGIS to be expected in 2021. In the event, no phase 2 funding from the US government was forthcoming after August 2020 when ULA Vulcan and SpaceX were selected by the Air Force. In 2020, Northrop Grumman announced the cancellation of OmegA.

 Vulcan 
ULA was awarded $967 million of phase 1 funding for further development of Vulcan as a potential competitor in future contracts. On 12 August 2019, ULA submitted Vulcan Centaur for phase 2 of the USAF's launch services competition. As of that time, Vulcan Centaur was on track for a 2021 launch.

Phase 2: selection of two launch vendors 

On 12 August 2019, at least three of the four companies submitted their final bids for the launch services competition. SpaceX bid the existing launch vehicles of Falcon 9 and Falcon Heavy, while Blue Origin was expected to bid New Glenn, ULA bid Vulcan Centaur, and NGIS's bid status was not reported. Blue Origin also filed a pre-award protest of the request for proposal arguing that the requirements were ambiguous.

The US Department of the Air Force announced the results of the approximately  National Security Space Launch Phase 2 Launch Service Procurement on 7 August 2020. SpaceX and ULA were the two vendors selected via the competition to supply launches to the US military in the 2022–2027 timeframe.
The US Space Force (USSF) plans 30–34 launches during these five fiscal years. ULA is expected to handle 60 percent of the launches  while SpaceX will handle 40 percent of the launches  over the five-year period.

The contract type for the phase 2 contracts is new for US government launches as it will be a "firm-fixed-price, indefinite-delivery" type of launch contract.  The awards in August 2020 are a major part of "the transition of the national security launch program to take advantage of commercial innovation and private investments in launch vehicles."

References 

Expendable space launch systems
Reusable launch systems
Space launch vehicles of the United States